Senator Cobb may refer to:

Amasa Cobb (1823–1905), Wisconsin State Senate
David Cobb (Massachusetts politician) (1748–1830), Massachusetts State Senate
George H. Cobb (1864–1943), New York State Senate
George T. Cobb (1813–1870), New Jersey State Senate
Rufus W. Cobb (1829–1913), Alabama State Senate
Stephen A. Cobb (1833–1878), Kansas State Senate
Thomas W. Cobb (1784–1830), U.S. Senator from Georgia